The 1966 Ohio gubernatorial election was held on November 8, 1966. Incumbent Republican Jim Rhodes defeated Democratic nominee Frazier Reams Jr. with 62.18% of the vote.

Primary elections
Primary elections were held on May 3, 1966.

Democratic primary

Candidates
Frazier Reams Jr., State Senator
Harry H. McIlwain, attorney

Results

Republican primary

Candidates
Jim Rhodes, incumbent Governor
William L. White

Results

General election

Candidates
Jim Rhodes, Republican 
Frazier Reams Jr., Democratic

Results

References

1966
Ohio
Gubernatorial
November 1966 events in the United States